Owińska  is a village in the administrative district of Gmina Czerwonak, within Poznań County, Greater Poland Voivodeship, in west-central Poland. The village has a population of 2,500.

Owińska lies close to the Warta river, on the main road and railway line from Poznań to Wągrowiec. In the village are a former Cistercian convent (now a school for the blind), a Renaissance church, and a palace built in late classical style (1804–1806).

World War II

Owińska was the location of a mental hospital where approximately 1,000 patients were murdered by Nazi Germany during World War II. They were shot in the back of the neck in the nearby forest. The victims were buried in 28 mass graves. In the second stage of the same "aktion" conducted after October 26, 1939, the remaining patients were taken to a bunker in Fort VII and gassed with carbon monoxide released from steel bottles. A year later, additional 200 patients from Poznań were brought in and gassed at the same location.

From August 1943 to January 1945 the Germans operated a subcamp of the Gross-Rosen concentration camp in the village, whose prisoners were mostly Poles and Russians.

References

External links
 
 

Villages in Poznań County
Palaces in Poland